The 1888 USC Methodists football team was an American football team that represented the University of Southern California during the 1888 college football season.  The team competed as an independent under coaches Henry H. Goddard and Frank H. Suffel, compiling a 2–0 record.

Schedule

References

USC
USC Trojans football seasons
College football undefeated seasons
USC Methodists football
USC Methodists football